Taro purée, also known as taro mash or taro paste, is a traditional dessert in Fujianese cuisine and Teochew cuisine. Made from puréed taro and lard and served on a flat plate, the dessert is normally topped with toasted sesame seeds, and occasionally with candied ginkgo, red dates, or melon seeds.

See also
 List of Chinese desserts
 Poi (food)

References

Taro dishes
Chinese desserts